Primorsky is a rural locality (a selo) in Bilbilsky Selsoviet, Magaramkentsky District, Republic of Dagestan, Russia. The population was 519 as of 2010. There are 18 streets.

Geography 
Primorsky is located 43 km northeast of Magaramkent (the district's administrative centre) by road. Bilbil-Kazmalyar and Khtun-Kazmalyar are the nearest rural localities.

Nationalities 
Lezgins live there.

References 

Rural localities in Magaramkentsky District